Hendrikx is a surname. Notable people with the surname include:

 Jan Hendrikx (mayor) (born 1944), Dutch mayor
 Marc Hendrikx (born 1974), Belgian football player

See also 

 Jimi Hendrix
 Hendric
 Hendrick (disambiguation)
 Hendricks (disambiguation)
 Hendrickx
 Hendrik (disambiguation)
 Hendriks
 Hendrix (disambiguation)
 Hendryx
 Henrik
 Henry (disambiguation)
 Henryk (given name)

Surnames of Belgian origin
Dutch-language surnames
Patronymic surnames
Surnames from given names